Florești is a commune in Cluj County, Transylvania, Romania. It is composed of three villages: Florești, Luna de Sus (Magyarlóna) and Tăuți (Kolozstótfalu) and is part of the Cluj-Napoca metropolitan area, being located less than 8 km west of Cluj-Napoca on DN1.

Benefiting from its proximity to Cluj-Napoca, the commune has seen a substantial development since the early 2000s, including a  threefold increase in population, mainly due to several new residential developments. It was the most populous commune in Romania recorded at the 2011 census.

Geography
Floreşti is located on the river Someșul Mic, in the centre of Cluj County, less than 8 km from the county capital, Cluj-Napoca, and 7 km from the commune of Gilău, on the Romanian National Road DN1.

Demographics

According to the 2011 census, the commune has 22,813 inhabitants, meaning that a 300% increase was recorded since the previous census of 2002 when 7,470 inhabitants were recorded. In terms of ethnic structure, the commune's population is composed of 75.2% Romanians, 14.4% Hungarians and 4.9% Roma.

Historical population
The historical population of the entire commune as recorded by the official censuses, and projected to the present-day administrative unit, was as follows:

Images

References

Communes in Cluj County
Localities in Transylvania